SS Jacksonville was a Merchant Marine tanker built by the Kaiser Shipbuilding Company at the Swan Island Shipyard in Portland, Oregon in 1943. It was named after the town of Jacksonville in Jackson County, Oregon, United States.

There were only two survivors of the 78 man crew: Marcellus Wegs and Frank Hodges.

Even though the ship was broken in half, it refused to sink. It required ships guns and depth charges from the convoy escorts to sink the rear section. The forward section continued to float for 15 hours.

References

External links 
 Wrecksite listing at wrecksite.eu
 Ship data at usmaritimecommission.de
 "Kaiser Swan Island, Portland OR" at shipbuildinghistory.com

Ships built in Portland, Oregon
Type T2-SE-A1 tankers
World War II tankers of the United States
1943 ships
Maritime incidents in August 1944
Ships sunk by German submarines in World War II